Douglas or Doug Henry may refer to:

Doug Henry (baseball) (born 1963), American former Major League Baseball relief pitcher
Doug Henry (motocross) (born 1969), American former motocross racer, three-time AMA national champion
Douglas Henry (1926–2017), US politician from Tennessee